Elections to Hastings Borough Council were held on 10 June 2004. Half of the council was up for election and the Labour Party lost overall control of the council to no overall control. Overall turnout was 34.5%.

After the election, the composition of the council was:
Labour 15
Conservative 13
Liberal Democrat 4

Election result

Ward results

References
2004 Hastings election result
Ward results
 Labour loses control of Hastings

2004
2004 English local elections
2000s in East Sussex